The following is a list of presidents of the entertainment division for the CBS television network. Frank Stanton, who served as the president of CBS between 1946 and 1971 and then as vice chairman until 1973, reorganized CBS into various divisions, including separate divisions for television and radio; the following executives served under him, CBS founder William S. Paley and later chairmen.

References